Allex may refer to:

People
 Dennis Allex (died 2013), French trainer executed by an Islamic group
 Jake Allex (1887–1959), Serbian American soldier
 Michel Allex (1947–2008), French chocolatier and politician

Places
 Allex, Drôme, commune near Crest in the Drôme department in southeastern France

Other
 Allex, trade name of desloratadine
 Allex Cargo, airline that merged into Air Japan
 Toyota Allex, also known as Toyota Corolla (E120)

See also
 Crocidura allex, also known as East African highland shrew
 Alex
 Alexx (disambiguation)